An order of merit is an honorific order that is conferred by a state, government, royal family, or other sovereign entity to an individual in recognition of military or civil merit. The historical background of the modern honours system of orders of merit may be traced to the emergence of chivalric orders during the Middle Ages.

Orders of merit may be bestowed as official awards by states, or as dynastic orders by royal families. In the case of modern republics, an order of merit may constitute the highest award conferred by the state authority.

National orders of merit

 Order of Merit of the Bavarian Crown, established in 1808 by the Kingdom of Bavaria
 National Order of Merit (Paraguay), established in 1865
 Order of Agricultural Merit (France), established in 1883
 Order of Merit, a Commonwealth order established in 1902 by King Edward VII
 Order of the Cross of Liberty (Finland), established in 1918
 Order of the White Rose of Finland, established in 1919
 Order pro Merito Melitensi, established in 1920 as a state decoration by the Sovereign Military Order of Malta
 Order of Merit (Lebanon), established in 1922 as the highest honour of the Republic of Lebanon
 Order of Civil Merit, Spain, established in 1926
 National Order of Honour and Merit (Haiti), established in 1926
 Order of Merit (Portugal), established in 1927, known by its current name since 1976
 Order of Merit (Chile), established in 1929
 Ordre du Mérite Maritime, established in 1930
 Order of Merit of the Principality of Liechtenstein, established in 1937
 Military Order of Merit (Iran), established in 1937
 Order of the Lion of Finland, established in 1942
 Legion of Merit, established by the United States Government in 1942
 National Order of Merit (Brazil), established in 1946
 Order of Civic Merit of Laos, established in 1950
 Order of Merit of the Italian Republic, established in 1951 as the highest honour of the Italian Republic
 Order of Merit of the Federal Republic of Germany, established in 1951 as the highest honour of the Federal Republic of Germany
 Order of Merit of the Austrian Republic, established in 1952 as the highest honour of the Austrian Republic
 Order of Civil Merit of the Syrian Arab Republic, established in 1953
 Order of Merit (Egypt), established in 1953
 Ordre des Palmes Académiques, established in 1955 by the French Republic for excellence in education
 Order of Central African Merit, established in 1959 as the highest civil decoration of the Central African Republic
 Order of Merit of the Grand Duchy of Luxembourg, established in 1961
 National Order of Merit (Mauritania), established in 1961
 Ordre national du Mérite (France), established in 1963
 Order of Merit (Jamaica), established in 1968
 Order of Ivory Merit, established in 1970
 National Order of Merit (Gabon), established in 1971
 Order of Merit (Cameroon), established in 1972
 Order of Merit (Malaysia), established in 1975 as the highest honour of Malaysia
 Order of Merit of the Republic of Poland, established in 1974
 National Order of Merit (Algeria), established in 1984
 Royal Norwegian Order of Merit, established in 1985
 National Order of Merit (Malta), established in 1990 as the highest honour of the Republic of Malta
 Order of Merit and Management, established in 1990
 Order of Merit of the Republic of Turkey, established in 1990
 Hungarian Order of Merit, established in 1991
 Order of Work Glory, established in 1992
 Order "For Merit to the Fatherland", established in 1994 for the Russian Federation
 Order of Merit (Ukraine), established in 1996
 Order of Merit of the Bahamas, established in 1996
 New Zealand Order of Merit, established in 1996
 Order of Merit (Antigua and Barbuda), established in 1998
 Order For Merit (Romania), a Romanian order, established in 2000
 Order of Merit of the Police Forces (Canada), established in 2000
 Order for Merits to Lithuania, established in 2002
 National Order of Merit (Bhutan), established in 2008
 Tuvalu Order of Merit was founded 2016 as the highest honour of Tuvalu
 Order of Honour (Greece)
 National Order of Merit (Guinea)
 National Order of Merit (Ecuador)
 Order of Civil Merit (France)
 Order of Civil Merit (South Korea)
 Pour le Mérite (1740–1918), the highest order of merit of Kingdom of Prussia founded in 1740 by King Frederick II of Prussia
 Order of Saint Michael (Bavaria) (1693–1918), founded in 1693 by Archbishop-Elector Joseph Clemens of Bavaria of Cologne, as a military order 1693–1803 and as an order of merit open to the Catholic nobility 1803-1918
 Indian Order of Merit (1837–1947), a military and civilian decoration of British India
 Order of Merit of Samoa (established 1992)

Dynastic orders of merit

 Order of Merit of Savoy, established in 1988 by the House of Savoy
 Order of Merit of the Portuguese Royal House, established in 1993 by the House of Braganza

See also
 Order (distinction)
 Order of Military Merit (disambiguation), a number of separate orders
 Order of Naval Merit (disambiguation), a number of separate orders
 Cross of Merit (disambiguation), a number of separate decorations
 Medal of Merit (disambiguation), a number of separate decorations
 Socialist orders of merit

References